Lytrosis unitaria, the common lytrosis moth, is a species of moth of the family Geometridae. It is found in North America, including Arkansas, Georgia, Iowa, Massachusetts, New Hampshire, New Jersey, New York, North Carolina, Ohio, Oklahoma, Ontario, Pennsylvania, South Carolina, Tennessee, Texas, Virginia, West Virginia and Wisconsin.

The wingspan is about 50 mm.

The larvae feed on Rosa, Crataegus, Amelanchier, Acer, Quercus and Viburnum species.

References

Moths described in 1854
Angeronini